Rhino Horn bananas, also called Rhino Horn plantains or African Rhino Horn, are hybrid banana cultivars from Africa. It produces strongly curved and elongated edible bananas which can grow to a length of two feet, the longest fruits among banana cultivars.

Taxonomy
The Rhino Horn banana is a triploid (AAB Group, commonly known as Horn plantains) hybrid of the seeded banana Musa balbisiana and Musa acuminata.

Its official designation is Musa acuminata × balbisiana (AAB Group) 'African Rhino Horn'.

Description
Rhino Horn banana plants can grow to a height of 12 to 20 feet. The pseudostem and leaves are dappled red.

Rhino Horn bananas have the longest fruits among banana cultivars, reaching up to 2 feet in length, though they normally only reach lengths of 12 to 14 inches. They produce two to four hands per bunch.

Uses
Fruits of the Rhino Horn bananas can be eaten raw or cooked. They are also cultivated as ornamental plants for their attractive coloration.

Pests and diseases

Common pests

Borers (Cosmopolites sordidus)
Grasshoppers
Root Nematodes (Radopholus similis)

Common diseases

Panama disease (Fusarium oxysporum f.sp. cubense)
Black Sigatoka (Mycosphaerella fijiensis)

See also
 Banana
 List of banana cultivars - Banana cultivar groups
 Musa
 Musa acuminata
 Musa balbisiana
 Plantain

References

Banana cultivars